is a railway station in Urayasu, Chiba, Japan, operated by the East Japan Railway Company (JR East).

Lines
The station is located 16.1 km from the western terminus of the line at Tokyo Station.

Station layout
The elevated station consists of two island platforms serving four tracks. The station has a "Midori no Madoguchi" staffed ticket office.

Platforms

The outer tracks (1 and 4) are generally used by stopping trains to allow non-stop trains to pass.

History
The station opened on 1 December 1988.

Station numbering was introduced in 2016 with Shin-Urayusu being assigned station number JE08.

Passenger statistics
In fiscal 2016, the JR East station was used by an average of 55,729 passengers daily (boarding passengers only).

Surrounding area
 Tokyo Disney Resort
 Meikai University Urayasu campus
 Juntendo University Urayasu campus
 Ryotokuji University
 Urayasu Minami High School (千葉県立浦安南高等学校)
 Urayasu Police Station

See also
 List of railway stations in Japan

References

External links

 Shin-Urayasu Station 

Railway stations in Chiba Prefecture
Stations of East Japan Railway Company
Railway stations in Japan opened in 1988
Urayasu, Chiba